Guanyinge is a town in the Dong River Valley in Boluo County in eastern Guangdong province, China. , it has one residential community and 14 villages under its administration.

See also 
 List of township-level divisions of Guangdong

References 

Towns in Guangdong
Boluo County